The Battle of Khatu Shyamji was fought between the Shekhawat chiefs and the Mughal Empire under Murtaza Khan Bhadech, a Mughal officer of Delhi. Murtaza Khan and 2200 of his 52000 soldiers were killed in the battle resulting in Jaipur-Shekhawat victory.

Background
In the month of August 1779, Murtaza Khan Bhadech attacked the Shekhawati region to extract fines from local Jagirdars. He entered Jaipur state from Taurawati pillaging two big towns of Thoi and Shree Madhopur. He then wrote to Rao Raja Devi Singh ji of Sikar asking him compensate for the expenditure for the attack (Fauz-Kharach) on Shekhawati, which Rao Raja Devi Singh ji refused at once saying that Sikar was a Jaipur state vassal and Bhadech had nothing to do with Sikar. This scared Murtaza Khan Bhadech for a while.

Najaf Khan too attacked Shekhawati but was defeated at Taurawati. Subedar Abdullah Khan also entered Jaipur state and just like Murtaza Khan and Najaf Khan, he also could not move ahead of Devli and was defeated there by the Shekhawati force.

Murtaza Khan meanwhile looted Reengus and made partial amends to the preceding failures. When Murtaza Khan proceeded further, the feudal quotas of Jaipur joined the Jaipur forces which were sent under the charge of Chood Singh ji Nathawat of Doongri and Dalel Singh ji Khangarot of Sewa. Along with the Rajput forces of Chood Singh ji and Dalel Singh ji was the Zamaat of Nagas under their very brave Mahant Mangal Das, Rao Raja Devi Singh ji of Sikar, Sujan Singh ji Sadani of Jhunjhunu, Thakur Aman Singh ji of Danta, Thakur Bhagat Singh ji of Khur and Thakur Pirbadan Singh ji of Khachariawas.

Battle
Murtaza Khan Bhadech thinking Khatu as a central place with enough drinking water, decided to strike it first with a good park of artillery and well-disciplined Mughal troops. The battle ensued vigorously where the Rajputs fought desperately to keep their hearths and homes safe, and to preserve at all costs the sanctity of the holy and the most famous temple of Shyamji (Shree Krishna bhagwan) which was situated at Khatu.

The Rajputs charged the mughal guns desperately. In this charge, Chood Singh Nathawat and his two sons Surajmal and Dalel Singh gloriously laid down their lives. Also, Mahant Mangal Das with his Zamaat fought like a hungry tiger killing Murtaza Khan Bhadech and his elephant. Mahant Mangal Das also lost his life along with his 1000 Dadupathies.

Aftermath
Thakur Pirbadan Singh ji of Khachariawas, son of Fateh Singh and grandson of Bhagwat Singh Ladkhani of Khachariawas, was severely wounded and was safely sent to Harsoli to dress his deep wounds.
In the Sikar quotas, Hanwant Singh, Son of Narsingh Das, Misri Khan and Sarfuddin Kayamkhani and many Taknet Rajputs, Ummed Singh of Paldi Thikana, Budh Singh Ladkhani of Singhason, Deokaran and Suja Dhabai, Arjun and Ummed Kanoogos, and many Rajputs from Beri, Nathawats of Dhiani, Narookas of Mel clan, and many Ranas, Darogas, Purohits and Barwas were killed in the battle. Among the followers of Shyam Singh, Hukam Singh Ladkhani, Durjan Singh Raoji ka Sekhawat, and Mahadan Charan of Chokha-ka-bas were also killed. Thakur Salehdi Singh of Doojod and Thakur Bhagat Singh of Khoor were also martyred. 
Murtaza Khan Bhadech along with his 2200 mughal sepoys was killed, and the Sekhawati arms won the great battle of Khatu Shyamjidas.
Good remuneration was given to the successors of the deceased in recognition and honour of the services rendered by them. Mahant Santokh Dasji succeeded Mahant Mangal Dasji, upon whom the Durbar conferred "Jangali bhalas, Chari, Nakkara, etc." as marks of great honour to the services of the deceased predecessor.

References

Sources

Khatu Shyamji
History of Rajasthan
Khatu Shyamji
Khatu Shyamji